CaVa CaVa were a short-lived English new wave group, best known for their 1982 single "Where's Romeo?". The band's only album, Cava Cava, was distributed by Regard Records, which was also the primary label of Haysi Fantayzee and One the Juggler.

Discography

Albums
CaVa CaVa (1983)

Singles

References

English new wave musical groups
Musical groups from Bournemouth